The 2000–01 Temple Owls men's basketball team represented Temple University in the 2000–01 NCAA Division I men's basketball season. They were led by head coach John Chaney in his 19th year. The Owls played their home games at the Liacouras Center. The Owls are members of the Atlantic 10 Conference. The Owls accepted a bid to the NCAA tournament where they made it to the Elite Eight, before losing to Michigan State.  Temple finished the season 24–13, 12–4 in A-10 play.

Roster

Schedule and results

Rankings

References

2014–15 Temple Owls Men's Basketball Media Guide

Temple
Temple
Temple Owls men's basketball seasons
Temple
Temple